Northwest Georgia is a region of the state of Georgia in the United States. It includes 12 counties (listed in the section below), which at the 2010 census had a combined population of 753,032. Northwest Georgia includes some of the southernmost portions of the Appalachian mountains, as opposed to Northeast Georgia, which holds the southernmost Blue Ridge, known locally as the North Georgia Mountains.

Bartow, Floyd, Haralson, Paulding, and Polk Counties are located on the outer northern fringe of the Atlanta metropolitan area, while the other counties are part of the Chattanooga, Tennessee metropolitan area. The largest city in Northwest Georgia is Rome, with about 36,000 inhabitants. Much of the region is included in Georgia's 14th congressional district and is represented by Marjorie Taylor Greene.

Counties 
The following 12 counties are part of Northwest Georgia.

 Bartow County
 Catoosa County
 Chattooga County
 Dade County
 Floyd County
 Gordon County
 Haralson County
 Murray County
 Paulding County
 Polk County
 Walker County
 Whitfield County

Most populous cities 

 Rome, 37,713; Floyd County
 Dalton, 34,417; Whitfield County
 Cartersville, 23,817; Bartow County
 Calhoun, 16,949; Gordon County
 Dallas, 14,042; Paulding County
 Fort Oglethorpe, 10,423; Catoosa County
 Cedartown, 10,190; Polk County
 Rocky Face, 8,570; Whitfield County
 Bremen, 7,185; Haralson County
 La Fayette, 6,888; Walker County
 Lindale, 4,789; Floyd County; Rome bedroom community
 Euharlee, 4,309; Bartow County; Cartersville bedroom community
 Rossville, 4,006; Walker County
 Hiram, 4,001; Paulding County
 Ringgold, 3,592; Catoosa County

See also
 Bordering regions in other states:
 East Tennessee
 North Alabama
 Western North Carolina
 North Georgia

References

 
Regions of Georgia (U.S. state)
Geography of Appalachia